A. Palanisamy (died 12 November 2007) was a volleyball player from Tamil Nadu, India. He represented the country in the Asian Games in early 60's. He hailed from Kallampatti near Melur, Madurai district, Tamil Nadu. He was nicknamed as Black Panther because of his ferocious attacks in 1962 Asian games held in Jakarta. He was named Asia's No 1 player in 1962. He was the first player to receive the Arjuna Award in 1961 in the volleyball category. He was the coach for Sivaganga district in Tamil Nadu before retiring in 1998.

External links
 Obituary

Sportspeople from Madurai
1930s births
2007 deaths
Recipients of the Arjuna Award
Indian men's volleyball players
Tamil sportspeople
Asian Games medalists in volleyball
Volleyball players at the 1962 Asian Games
Medalists at the 1962 Asian Games
Asian Games silver medalists for India
Volleyball players from Tamil Nadu